Haryana Football Association (HFA) is the state governing body of football in Haryana. It is affiliated with the All India Football Federation, the national governing body.

References

Football in Haryana
Football governing bodies in India